UJ-121 Jochen was a German submarine chaser that hit a mine in the North Sea off Ostend, West Flanders, Belgium.

Sinking 
On 2 September 1940, UJ-121 was sunk by a mine while she was approaching Ostend Harbour, West Flanders, Belgium. Thirteen crew lost their lives.

References

Auxiliary ships of the Kriegsmarine
World War II auxiliary ships of Germany
Ships sunk by mines
Maritime incidents in September 1940
Shipwrecks in the North Sea